Glenn Grisillo (born 25 July 1946) is a South African former professional tennis player.

Grisillo, a Reno resident originally from Johannesburg, featured twice in the mixed doubles main draw at Wimbledon, including in 1966 when he made the third round partnering Cora Schediwy. He played collegiate tennis for Mississippi State University on a scholarship, later transferring to the University of Nevada. In 1971, for a charity event, he set a record with his cousin Mel Baleson of playing continuous tennis for 73 hours and 25 minutes. Unofficially, the two played a total of 2,224 games. It was listed in the Guinness Book of World Records.

References

External links
 

1946 births
Living people
South African male tennis players
Tennis players from Johannesburg
Mississippi State Bulldogs tennis players
Nevada Wolf Pack athletes